Diary of a Single Mom is a drama web series. This series is about three single mothers and their fight through obstacles trying to get ahead.

Cast
 Monica Calhoun as Ocean
 Valery M. Ortiz as Lupe
 Janice Lynde as Peggy
 Jonathan Biggs as Sammy
 Nieko Mann as Trina
 Billy Dee Williams as Uncle Bo

Awards and recognition
The series was voted Indie Soap Awards of the Year and Best Guest Actor in 2009, receiving 13 award nominations in that year.

References

American drama web series